Thomas Breen (born 24 July 1990) is an Irish hurler who plays for Kilkenny IHC club St Martin's. He previously lined out at inter-county level with the Kilkenny senior hurling team.

Career

Breen played with the Castlecomer Community School hurling team that won the Leinster Colleges Championship in 2007. He simultaneously lined out with the St Martin's club at juvenile and underage levels before eventually progressing onto the club's senior team. Breen first appeared on the inter-county scene as captain of the Kilkenny minor hurling team that beat Galway in the 2008 All-Ireland minor final. After an unsuccessful tenure with the under-21 team, he was drafted onto the Kilkenny senior hurling team in 2013. Breen shared in the team's National Hurling League success in his debut season before claiming Walsh Cup honours in 2014.

Career statistics

Honours

Castlecomer Community School
Leinster Colleges Senior Hurling Championship: 2007

Kilkenny
National Hurling League: 2013
Walsh Cup: 2014
All-Ireland Minor Hurling Championship: 2008 
Leinster Minor Hurling Championship: 2008

References

1990 births
Living people
St Martin's (Kilkenny) hurlers
Kilkenny inter-county hurlers
Hurling forwards